Just Inès is a 2010 British film written and directed by Marcel Grant. The film follows Tom Jackson, played by renowned UK actor Daniel Weyman, through a period of redemption after a prison sentence for domestic violence. Only through a new relationship with French girl Inès, played by well-known actress Caroline Ducey, can he find back his way in life.

The film was shot in United Kingdom and France as an independent production by the London-based production company Dancing Brave Pictures. The film received its world premiere to high acclaim at the 2010 International Filmfestival Mannheim-Heidelberg  and was also screened at the 2010 Cairo International Film Festival, Egypt.

Plot 
The film starts with a depiction of Tom's current life. A businessman, he is lost in his deals and betrays his wife with a Buddhist girlfriend of his. When his wife threatens to leave him, he loses control and beats her violently. He is sentenced to 6 months in prison.

After being released and having spent some time with his mother and his brother, who live in a trailer park in absence of the early deceased father, he decides to move to London. Overcoming initial problems with the agent regarding his criminal record, he finally moves into a flat in Bloomsbury.

Self-doubt and loneliness now seem to dominate his days. He eventually befriends a young girl called PJ. A friendship develops, which helps Tom regaining a bit of warmth and colour in life. But then Tom meets his beautiful French neighbour Inès. A tender connection develops among them.

This quietly mysterious woman intrigues Tom. When he finds out about her life, it finally puts everything in Tom’s own story into perspective. There might be damage, but there is always hope.

Cast 
 Daniel Weyman as Tom Jackson
 Caroline Ducey as Inès Cole
 Barbara Cabrita as Olivia
 Veronica Roberts as Tom's mother
 Alice O'Connell as PJ

References

External links 
 
 

2010 films
British drama films
2010s English-language films
2010s British films